Gillian Varick Justiana (born 5 March 1991) is a Curaçaoan international footballer. He plays as a midfielder.

Career
Justiana has played for FC Zwolle, Helmond Sport and IJsselmeervogels.

He made his international debut for Curaçao in 2011, and has appeared in FIFA World Cup qualifying matches.

Honours

International
Curaçao
 Caribbean Cup: 2017

References

1991 births
Living people
Dutch footballers
Dutch people of Curaçao descent
Footballers from Overijssel
Curaçao footballers
Curaçao international footballers
PEC Zwolle players
Helmond Sport players
Eerste Divisie players
Tweede Divisie players
Sportspeople from Zwolle
Association football fullbacks
2017 CONCACAF Gold Cup players
IJsselmeervogels players